Helen E. Burbank (July 27, 1898—February 22, 1981) was a career public servant in Vermont.  She was the longtime Deputy Secretary of State, and served for over a year as Secretary of State of Vermont after she was appointed to fill a vacancy.

Biography
Helen Elizabeth Burbank was born in Otego, New York on July 27, 1898, the daughter of Horace J. Burbank (1869-1914) and Edith L. Wicks (1866-1950).  She was raised in Vermont, and graduated from St. Johnsbury Academy.

Burbank was initially employed in the office of the Vermont Commissioner of Industry.  During World War I, Burbank was the personal assistant for the Vermont director of the United States Employment Service.  After the war, she was employed at a Montpelier insurance agency, and then returned to the Vermont Commissioner of Industry's office as a stenographer.

In August 1920, Burbank accepted a position in the office of the Secretary of State of Vermont.  In 1927, the incumbent Secretary, Rawson C. Myrick, appointed her as his deputy.  Burbank served as Deputy Secretary of State until 1947.

In August, 1947, Myrick resigned.  Ernest W. Gibson Jr., then serving as Governor of Vermont, requested that Burbank continue the functions of the secretary's office while remaining as deputy; she agreed.  In October, Gibson appointed Burbank to fill the Secretary's position, and she served until January, 1949.  Burbank spent several weeks in the hospital at the end of 1947 and beginning of 1948, and declined to be a candidate for Secretary of State in the 1948 election.

In 1948, Republican Howard E. Armstrong ran successfully for Secretary of State.  Upon succeeding Burbank in January, 1949, Armstrong reappointed Burbank as Deputy Secretary of State.  She continued to serve as deputy until December, 1965.

In 1964, Harry H. Cooley was elected as part of that year's nationwide Democratic landslide and became the first Democrat to win the Secretary of State's post.  He took office in January, 1965; in December, he decided to employ a deputy of his own choosing, and relieved Burbank of her duties.  She was subsequently employed by the Vermont Legislative Council.  Burbank was mentioned as a candidate for Secretary of State in 1966; she remained active in Republican politics as a local and county committee member and delegate to party conventions, but made no effort to run.

In 1968, Republican Richard C. Thomas won the Secretary of State's position.  He employed Armstrong and Burbank on a consulting basis at the start of his eight-year tenure.

Death and burial
In retirement, Burbank continued to reside in Montpelier.  She died in Berlin on February 22, 1981.  Burbank was buried at Mount Pleasant Cemetery in St. Johnsbury.

References

Sources

Books

Newspapers

Internet

1898 births
1981 deaths
People from Otsego County, New York
People from St. Johnsbury, Vermont
People from Montpelier, Vermont
St. Johnsbury Academy alumni
Vermont Republicans
Secretaries of State of Vermont
Burials in Vermont